Gibber Gabber is a weekly newspaper published in Woomera, South Australia; it has been published continuously by the Woomera Board since August 1950.

History
Gibber Gabber began as a local community magazine (or newsletter) for Woomera residents, with the first issue on 11 August 1950. It is published weekly on Fridays by the Woomera Board, whose aim is to build the sense of community, given its remote location. The newspaper's main office is on Banool Avenue, Woomera.

Local themes covered by the newspaper include:
 The Woomera community
 Indigenous Australia, health and the environment
 Border protection - such as Woomera Immigration Reception and Processing Centre
 Rail transport - national, as well as Central Australia Railway, Northern Australian Railway, and the Trans-Australian Railway
 Space technology and the space race - e.g. Defence Science and Technology Group and the RAAF Woomera Range Complex
 Nurrungar and satellite tracking stations - Joint Defense Facility Nurrungar
 The Cold War - local atomic bomb testing at Maralinga
 Science fiction from the Cold War era - including reports of unidentified flying objects

Distribution
The newspaper is distributed both in print form and also online.

Digitisation
Microform versions of the newspaper from January 1991 are available from the State Library of South Australia and Australian National Library. Some more recent issues are also available at Issuu.

References

External links
 Official website (outdated)
 Online issues (at Issuu.com)

Newspapers published in South Australia
Publications established in 1950
Weekly newspapers published in Australia